Ralph Dawson (April 18, 1897 in Westborough, Massachusetts – November 15, 1962) was an American film editor who also did some acting, directing, and screenwriting. He was nominated for the Academy Award for Best Film Editing four times, and won the Award three times.

Selected filmography as editor
1925: Lady of the Night
1928: The Singing Fool with co-editor Harold McCord
1928: Tenderloin
1929: Stark Mad
1929: The Desert Song
1930: Under a Texas Moon
1931: The Mad Genius
1933: Girl Missing
1934: Something Always Happens with co-editor Bert Bates
1934: The Life of the Party
1935: A Midsummer Night's Dream - First Academy Award
1936: Anthony Adverse - Second Academy Award win
1936: The Story of Louis Pasteur
1937: The Prince and the Pauper
1938: The Adventures of Robin Hood - Third Academy Award win
1938: Four Daughters
1939: Daughters Courageous
1939: Espionage Agent
1941: The Great Lie
1942: Kings Row 
1942: Larceny, Inc.
1944: The Adventures of Mark Twain
1944: Mr. Skeffington
1945: Saratoga Trunk
1948: An Act of Murder
1950: Harvey 
1952: The Lusty Men
1954: The High and the Mighty - Fourth Academy Award nomination

External links

American film editors
Best Film Editing Academy Award winners
1897 births
1962 deaths